Gzhel is a Russian style of ceramics.

Gzhel may also refer to:
Gzhel (rural locality), several rural localities in Russia
Gzhel railway station, a railway station on the Moscow–Kazan line in the vicinity of Gzhel (selo), Moscow Oblast
Gzhel (theater), a Russian dance theater of Vladimir Mikhailovich Zakharov

See also
Gzhelian, the youngest stage of the Pennsylvanian geologic period
Gzhelskogo kirpichnogo zavoda, a rural locality (a settlement) in Ramensky District of Moscow Oblast, Russia